Howard House in Palestine, Texas was built in 1848 by Reuben A. Reeves, Texas State Supreme Court Justice, and justice of the Supreme Court of the New Mexico Territory. When Reeves moved away from Palestine in 1850, the house was purchased by local merchant George R. Howard. Attaining the rank of colonel from his service with the Tennessee State Militia, Howard also served with the Confederate States Army. As a civilian, Howard served in numerous state and local elected positions, including as mayor of Palestine. Upon the deaths of Howard and his wife, the house was inherited by their son  Thomas S. Howard. The city of Palestine purchased the house as a museum in 1964.  It was listed on the NRHP in 1993.

The Howard House Museum is owned by the city and furnished for a late 19th-century appearance.  It is open for tours and special functions by appointment.

See also

National Register of Historic Places listings in Anderson County, Texas
Recorded Texas Historic Landmarks in Anderson County

References

External links

Houses on the National Register of Historic Places in Texas
Houses completed in 1848
Museums in Anderson County, Texas
Historic house museums in Texas
Houses in Anderson County, Texas
National Register of Historic Places in Anderson County, Texas
Recorded Texas Historic Landmarks